Journal of Astronomical Telescopes, Instruments, and Systems is a quarterly, peer-reviewed scientific journal covering the development, testing, and application of telescopes, instrumentation, techniques, and systems for ground- and space-based astronomy, published by SPIE. The editor-in-chief is Mark Clampin (NASA Goddard Space Flight Center, USA).

Abstracting and indexing
The journal is abstracted and indexed in:
 SAO/NASA Astrophysics Data System (ADS)
 Science Citation Index Expanded
 Current Contents - Engineering, Computing & Technology
 Inspec
 Scopus
 Ei/Compendex
According to the Journal Citation Reports, the journal has a 2020 impact factor of 1.436.

References

External links
 

Optics journals
Engineering journals
SPIE academic journals
English-language journals
Publications established in 2015